In medicine, a bleb is a blister-like protrusion (often hemispherical) filled with serous fluid. Blebs can form in a number of tissues by different pathologies, including frostbite and can "appear and disappear within a short time interval". 

In pathology pulmonary blebs are small subpleural thin-walled air-containing spaces, not larger than 1-2 cm in diameter. Their walls are less than 1 mm thick. If they rupture, they allow air to escape into pleural space, resulting in a spontaneous pneumothorax.

In ophthalmology, blebs may be formed intentionally in the treatment of glaucoma. In such treatments, functional blebs facilitate the circulation of aqueous humor, the blockage of which will lead to increase in eye pressure. Use of collagen matrix wound modulation device such as ologen during glaucoma surgery is known to produce vascular and functional blebs, which are positively correlated with treatment success rate. 

In the lungs, a bleb is a collection of air within the layers of the visceral pleura. 

In breasts a bleb is a milk blister (also known as blocked nipple pore, nipple blister, or “milk under the skin”).

External links
Medical definition of bleb on MedicineNet.com
Moorfields Bleb Grading System

References

Skin conditions resulting from physical factors
Medical terminology
Ophthalmology